The 1996 BPR 4 Hours of Jarama was the third race of the 1996 BPR Global GT Series.  It was run at the Circuito Permanente Del Jarama on 14 April 1996.

Official results
Class winners in bold.  Cars failing to complete 75% of winner's distance marked as Not Classified (NC).

Statistics
 Pole Position - #3 Harrods Mach One Racing - 1:30.053
 Fastest Lap - #28 Ennea Igol - 1:33.345

External links
 Race Results
 Photo Archive

Jarama
1000 km Jarama
Jarama